Characidium is a genus of fish in the family Crenuchidae (South American darters). They are mainly found in South America, but C. marshi is from Panama.

Species
There are currently 69 recognized species in this genus:

 Characidium alipioi Travassos, 1955
 Characidium amaila Lujan, Agudelo-Zamora, Taphorn, Booth & López-Fernández, 2013
 Characidium bahiense V. G. Almeida, 1971
 Characidium bimaculatum Fowler, 1941
 Characidium boavistae Steindachner, 1915
 Characidium boehlkei Géry, 1972
 Characidium bolivianum N. E. Pearson, 1924
 Characidium borellii (Boulenger, 1895)
 Characidium brevirostre Pellegrin, 1909
 Characidium caucanum C. H. Eigenmann, 1912
Characidium chancoense 
 Characidium chupa L. P. Schultz, 1944
 Characidium clistenesi M. R. S. de Melo & Espíndola, 2016
 Characidium crandellii Steindachner, 1915
 Characidium declivirostre Steindachner, 1915
 Characidium deludens Zanata & Camelier, 2015
 Characidium etheostoma Cope, 1872
 Characidium etzeli Zarske & Géry, 2001
 Characidium fasciatum J. T. Reinhardt, 1867 
 Characidium geryi (Zarske, 1997)
 Characidium gomesi Travassos, 1956
 Characidium grajahuense Travassos, 1944
 Characidium hasemani Steindachner, 1915
 Characidium heinianum Zarske & Géry, 2001
 Characidium heirmostigmata da Graça & Pavanelli, 2008
 Characidium helmeri Zanata, Sarmento-Soares & Martins-Pinheiro, 2015
 Characidium interruptum Pellegrin, 1909
 Characidium japuhybense Travassos, 1949
 Characidium kamakan Zanata & Camelier, 2015
 Characidium lagosantense Travassos, 1947
 Characidium lanei Travassos, 1967
 Characidium laterale (Boulenger, 1895)
 Characidium lauroi Travassos, 1949
 Characidium litorale Leitão & Buckup, 2014
 Characidium longum Taphorn, Montaña & Buckup, 2006
 Characidium macrolepidotum (W. K. H. Peters, 1868)
 Characidium marshi Breder, 1925
 Characidium mirim Netto-Ferreira, Birindelli & Buckup, 2013
 Characidium nana Mendonça & Netto-Ferreira, 2015
 Characidium nupelia da Graça, Pavanelli & Buckup, 2008
 Characidium occidentale Buckup & R. E. dos Reis, 1997
 Characidium oiticicai Travassos, 1967
 Characidium onca M. R. S. de Melo, Mauro César Lambert de Brito Ribeiro & F. C. T. Lima, 2021
 Characidium orientale Buckup & R. E. dos Reis, 1997
 Characidium papachibe L. A. W. Peixoto & Wosiacki, 2013
 Characidium pellucidum C. H. Eigenmann, 1909
 Characidium phoxocephalum C. H. Eigenmann, 1912
 Characidium pteroides C. H. Eigenmann, 1909
 Characidium pterostictum A. L. Gomes, 1947
 Characidium purpuratum Steindachner, 1882
 Characidium rachovii Regan, 1913
 Characidium roesseli Géry, 1965
 Characidium samurai Zanata & Camelier, 2014
 Characidium sanctjohanni Dahl, 1960
 Characidium satoi M. R. S. de Melo & Oyakawa, 2015
 Characidium schindleri Zarske & Géry, 2001
 Characidium schubarti Travassos, 1955
 Characidium serrano Buckup & R. E. dos Reis, 1997
 Characidium steindachneri Cope, 1878
 Characidium sterbai (Zarske, 1997) 
 Characidium stigmosum M. R. S. de Melo & Buckup, 2002
 Characidium summum Zanata & Ohara, 2015
 Characidium tenue (Cope, 1894)
 Characidium timbuiense Travassos, 1946
 Characidium travassosi M. R. S. de Melo, Buckup & Oyakawa, 2016
 Characidium vestigipinne Buckup & L. Hahn, 2000
 Characidium vidali Travassos, 1967
 Characidium xanthopterum Silveira, Langeani, da Graça, Pavanelli & Buckup, 2008
 Characidium xavante da Graça, Pavanelli & Buckup, 2008
 Characidium zebra C. H. Eigenmann, 1909

References

Characiformes genera
Freshwater fish genera
Taxa named by Johannes Theodor Reinhardt
Crenuchidae